Sir Hugh Dillon Massy, 2nd Baronet (9 November 1767 – 28 March 1842) was an Anglo-Irish politician and baronet.

Massy was the son of Sir Hugh Massy, 1st Baronet and Elizabeth Stacpoole. In 1797 he was elected to the Irish House of Commons as the Member of Parliament for Clare, and sat for the seat until its abolition under the Acts of Union 1800.  He was returned to the House of Commons of the United Kingdom as the MP for Clare in 1801, but lost his seat in the 1802 United Kingdom general election. On 29 April 1807 he succeeded to his father's baronetcy.

He married Sarah Hankey, daughter of Thomas Hankey and Mary Wyver, on 14 May 1796.

References

1767 births
1842 deaths
18th-century Anglo-Irish people
19th-century Anglo-Irish people
Baronets in the Baronetage of Ireland
Irish MPs 1790–1797
Irish MPs 1798–1800
Members of the Parliament of Ireland (pre-1801) for County Clare constituencies
UK MPs 1801–1802
Members of the Parliament of the United Kingdom for County Clare constituencies (1801–1922)